Upside Down 2020 is reggae and dancehall artist Buju Banton's thirteenth studio album. It was released on June 26, 2020, through Gargamel Music and Roc Nation. The album is Buju's first release after his prison release.

The song "Unity" is featured on the FIFA 21 soundtrack.

Critical reception
Danny Schwarz of Rolling Stone gave the album four stars out of five, praising the album for its content by saying "from the political sermons tracks to the love songs, he sounds spry and engaged. It's like he never left." Damien Morris of The Guardian also gave the album four stars out of five, saying that Banton is "as good as he's ever been". Will Hodgkinson of The Times however gave the album a negative review, giving it two stars out of five by stating that the body of work is "beautiful moments, but not a great comeback."

Track listing

Charts

References

2020 albums
Buju Banton albums